Yang Shuo (April 28, 1913 – August 3, 1968) was a Chinese lyricist and essayist born in Penglai, Shandong, who produced over a hundred works. He committed suicide during the Cultural Revolution by overdose on sedatives.

1913 births
1968 suicides
Chinese male short story writers
Republic of China essayists
People's Republic of China essayists
People from Penglai, Shandong
Writers from Yantai
Suicides during the Cultural Revolution
Drug-related suicides in China
Suicides in the People's Republic of China
20th-century essayists
Republic of China short story writers
Short story writers from Shandong
Politicians from Yantai
People's Republic of China politicians from Shandong